Lee Tong-shing (born 6 December 1947) is a Taiwanese former swimmer. He competed in four events at the 1968 Summer Olympics, placing 6th, 7th, and 8th consecutively in the 100m butterfly, 100m freestyle, and the 400m individual medley. He was disqualified from the 200m individual medley.

References

External links
 

1947 births
Living people
Taiwanese male swimmers
Olympic swimmers of Taiwan
Swimmers at the 1968 Summer Olympics
Sportspeople from Taipei